Teruhiko Kobayashi (小林 照彦, Kobayashi Teruhiko, 17 November 1920 – 4 June 1957) was a Japanese fighter pilot during World War II and a flying ace of the Imperial Japanese Army Air Force. Initially beginning his flying career as a bomber pilot, he rose to fame when he became the leader of 244th Sentai, making him the youngest Sentai leader in the IJAAF when he took command of it in November 1944. He was described as an excellent and charismatic leader by his men and under his command the 244th would become the most famous and successful aerial defense unit in Japan. While leading this unit he achieved five kills (three Boeing B-29 Superfortresses and two F6F "Hellcats") in the aerial defense of the Japanese Home Islands. He would survive the war and in 1954 join the newly created Japan Air Self-Defense Force (JASDF).

Early life 
Teruhiko Kobayashi was born on 17 November 1920, in Tokyo Prefecture and would receive his education at Kokushikan Junior High School. He would end up later attending the Imperial Japanese Army Academy in the late 1930s graduating in 1940 in the 53rd class of the academy. Upon graduation he was appointed as a second lieutenant in the artillery, he would later switch this to become a light bomber pilot and began his flight training to become a bomber pilot. After completing flight training he was assigned to the 45th Sentai.

World War II 

As a bomber pilot, Kobayashi would participate in one of the first actions in the war at the Battle of Hong Kong in December 1941. During this battle as part of the 45th Sentai, he would pilot an obsolete Kawasaki Ki-32 "Mary" light bomber attacking British military installations and ships. He would later join the 66th Sentai based in Manchuria, gaining valuable experience with this unit. In November 1943 he officially switched from a being a bomber pilot to being a fighter pilot, and would go on to receive his fighter pilot training at the Akeno Army Air Service School at its Kameyama Branch. After completing fighter student education, he was kept in Japan for instructor duties at Akeno Army Airfield, Sano Army Airfield, and Hayashi Army Airfield.

In late November 1944, at the rank of captain, he was given command of the 244th Sentai based at Chōfu Airbase, he was only 24 years old at the time, making him the youngest sentai commander in all of the IJAAF. The 244th Sentai was assigned to the aerial defense of the capital Tokyo, as commander of this unit Kobayashi would pilot the Kawasaki Ki-61 "Hien" fighter, the 244th had around 40 Ki-61s by October 1944 and had spent a large amount of time training to intercept B-29 bombers that would inevitably come bomb the capital. As a result of this the 244th was considered a good unit whose pilots were adequate as they had been given a good amount of training, they were also one of the only home defense fighter units that practiced night formation flying allowing them to do night interceptions (this was limited to the more veteran pilots).

On 3 December 1944, Kobayashi shot down his first B-29 in a single pass the 244th claimed 6 of these bombers on that same sortie through ramming attacks with all pilots surviving their attacks. On 22 December 1944, Kobayashi claimed a B-29 damaged when the bombers came to attack a Mitsubishi factory which was later aborted, the B-29 which was damaged by Kobayashi's head on attack had its No.3 engine damaged the bomber then soon fell out of formation and failed to return to its base. On 27 January 1945 during a diving attack on a B-29, Kobayashi's "Hein" fighter rammed into the B-29, he luckily parachuted and landed safely on the ground suffering only minor bruises. The exploits of the 244th were published daily in the newspapers at time, earning the young captain much fame.

Kobayashi would once again damage another B-29 on 12 April 1945, but was wounded in the leg as a result of the attack forcing him to parachute once again. In May 1945 he began flying the new Kawasaki Ki-100 (Type 5 Army Fighter) which had a more reliable engine compared to the Hein and better performance as well as armament. In that same month his unit would receive a letter of commendation from the Army High Command and his actions would be recognized when he was awarded the Second-class Bukōshō medal as well as a promotion to major.

Major Kobayashi was almost court martialed as a result of disobeying orders on July 25, 1945, when he and his men took off in their Kawasaki Ki-100 Goshikisen (Type 5 Fighter) fighters in order to attack marauding US Navy F6F Hellcats of VF-31 from the carrier USS Belleau Wood (CVL-24). Kobayashi's unit had been ordered to stand down and wait for incoming bombers. Ignoring this order, they then proceeded to engage the Hellcats that were attacking Yokaichi Air Field in an aerial dogfight that took place almost at hangar-top height. The 244th claimed that they had destroyed 10 Hellcats from VF-31 when in reality both sides lost 2 planes each. While the newspapers celebrated the unit's actions, the court martial was set to go on for the young commander, which carried a very serious penalty. However, when news of Kobayashi's actions reached the Emperor, and words of Imperial approval for Kobayashi's actions were spoken, the court martial was dropped.

Post-war years 
Major Kobayashi survived the war and would go working in the civilian sector for some nine years until joining the recently created Japan Air Self-Defense Force in 1954. He entered the Japan Air Self-Defense Force executive school and went on to become a fighter pilot again. After working at Matsushima and Tsuiki bases, he studied abroad in the United States for about half a year from November 1955, and received training on the operation of F-86 fighters. On 4 June 1957 Kobayashi was flying a T-33 Shooting Star on a training sortie from Hamamatsu when a technical problem occurred just shortly after takeoff. He ordered his companion in the jet with him to eject, after his companion did he tried to take control of the aircraft and attempt to land it away from any populated areas, but crashed shortly after.

References

Bibliography

1920 births
1957 deaths
Aviators killed in aviation accidents or incidents in Japan
Japanese World War II flying aces
Japan Air Self-Defense Force personnel
Victims of aviation accidents or incidents in 1957